The INA Martyrs' Memorial complex is a war memorial at Moirang, India, dedicated to the soldiers of the Indian National Army. The main feature of the complex is a reconstruction of the INA's memorial to its fallen soldiers as it stood in Singapore, before its demolition at the hands of British Indian Army sappers in 1945. The complex also contains a museum dedicated to the INA along with a library and an auditorium and a statue of Subhas Chandra Bose. Work on the cenotaph itself began in October 1968 and was completed in September 1969, when it was unveiled by Indira Gandhi. Work on expanding the monument complex to present-day size was completed in 2005, when it was unveiled. The total cost in building the memorial was Rs 6.23 crores. A stone monument has also been erected at the historic Moirang Kangla, where Colonel S. A. Malik leading an INA unit raised the flag of Azad Hind in April 1944. The Imphal state government has administered the site since 1985. Close to the complex is the peace memorial at Lotpaching, raised by the Japanese government.

See also
Former Indian National Army Monument
Battle of Imphal
Shaukat Hayat Malik
Indian National Army

References

 

Monuments and memorials in India
Indian National Army